Baobo Neuendorf-Duaba (born 31 August 1972) is a Papua New Guinean sprinter. He competed in the men's 4 × 400 metres relay at the 1992 Summer Olympics.

References

External links

1972 births
Living people
Athletes (track and field) at the 1992 Summer Olympics
Papua New Guinean male sprinters
Papua New Guinean male hurdlers
Olympic athletes of Papua New Guinea
World Athletics Championships athletes for Papua New Guinea
Place of birth missing (living people)